Roll Player is a euro-style board game designed by Keith Matejka and published in 2016 by Thunderworks Games. In the game, players compete to design the best fantasy adventurer, through dice rolling and card drafting mechanics.

Development 
The game was funded through Kickstarter crowdfunding platform.

The game received two expansions (Roll Player: Monsters & Minions in 2018 and Roll Player: Fiends & Familiars in 2020).

Reception 
The game received generally favorable reviews.

Awards 

 2016 Golden Geek Most Innovative Board Game Nominee

Spin-offs 
Several other games share the same setting (universe) as Roll Player, including Cartographers (2019), Lockup: A Roll Player Tale (2019) and Roll Player: Adventures (2021).

See also 
 Cartographers (board game)

External links 

 
 Roll player at Thunderworks Games

References 

Board games introduced in 2016
Fantasy board games